Gian Pietro Brogiolo (Polpenazze del Garda, Brescia, 1946) is professor of Medieval archaeology at the University of Padua and editor-in-chief of the European Journal of Post-Classical Archaeologies.  He is one of the founders of the journals Archeologia Medievale and Archeologia dell'Architettura.

Selected publications 
The idea and ideal of the town between late antiquity and the early middle ages. Leiden: Brill Publishers, 1999. (Editor with Bryan Ward-Perkins) 
Atti del secondo congresso nazionale di archeologia medievale. All'insegna Del Giglio, 2000. (Editor) 
Le origini della città medievale. Sap, 2011

References

External links
Brogiolo lecturing on The early medieval city. 

Italian archaeologists
Living people
Year of birth missing (living people)
Academic journal editors
Academic staff of the University of Padua
Medieval archaeologists